Filipo Levi is the former International Rugby Captain for Manu Samoa and has captained teams from a local and international stage since 2000 until 2013. Filipo experience and knowledge is understanding business leaders unique challenges from a local to international context. He is passionate in helping leaders build strong resilient teams and equipping, empowering people to overcome challenges. 

In 2011 Filipo was bestowed with the ancient Samoan chief Tulafale-orator speaking title of Mulitalo from the village of Lano in Savai'i Samoa. The Samoan chief system is over 3000 years and a Tulafale chief title is one to lead by serving the people. 

In 2018 Filipo Founded the RUBC Rugby Union Business Club. RUBC is a social initiative in supporting Rugby players in their transitioning and starting their businesses and careers. RUBC is a metaphor of surrounding a Rugby player with mentors, business coaches, financial advisors and entrepreneurs to plan to succeed in life after sport.  When the spotlight fades, RUBC is filling this gap to continue the team in life after Rugby. 

Filipo attained his masters and bachelor's degree from the University of Otago while playing professional Rugby.

Career
International

Levi was part of the Samoa squad at the 2007 Rugby World Cup, but a severe eye socket injury forced him out of the tournament. Levi was a member of the Samoa squad at the 2011 Rugby World Cup. In 2008 Levi took over the Manu Samoa captaincy after long time captain Semo Sititi focused on playing and all but retired from International duties.
In 2011 Levi again Captained Manu Samoa against Ikale Tahi Tonga in Fiji before playing the Wallabies Australian Rugby team where Manu Samoa were victorious in Sydney.

New Zealand

Levi grew up in Glen Innes Auckland before moving to Dunedin where his Father Reverend Fogatia Lavea Levi was accepted into University of Otago Knox Theological Studies. He attended Logan Park High School before joining Otago Boys' High School where they were the first team from the South Island to have won the national 1st XV competition in 1998, playing alongside future All Black Captain Richie McCaw.

Levi was then selected for the New Zealand Colts that won the 2000 U21 World Cup in New Zealand playing alongside the likes of Carl Hayman, Keven Mealamu, Mils Muliaina, Seilala Mapusua, Aaron Mauger, Gavin Williams, Clarke Dermody, Ben Blair, Rodney Sooialo, Jerry Collins and Richie McCaw

Levi played for the local Dunedin club Alhambra Union from 1999-2007 and for Otago Rugby 2000-2006. Levi signed for Super 12 side the Highlanders in 2002 and went on to become one of their most capped players leaving in 2007. Levi played his final club games for Auckland Marist Tamaki in 2012-2013. 

In 2016 Filipo Coached Auckland Marist Tamaki and finished in 2018 and is involved with College Rifles Rugby since 2019-2020. 

UK

In February 2009 the Ospreys signed him from Japanese side Ricoh Black Rams. At the end of the 2008–09 Magners League he signed for Premiership side Newcastle Falcons as primarily a back row player. In November 2011 Nottingham signed him from Newcastle Falcons until the end of the 2011–12 RFU Championship.

References

External links
Samoa data on Rugby data
Official Samoa Rugby Union
Manu Samoa supporters website
Pacific Islanders Profile
Ospreys Profile
Newcastle Profile

1979 births
Living people
Black Rams Tokyo players
Expatriate rugby union players in England
Expatriate rugby union players in Japan
Expatriate rugby union players in Wales
Highlanders (rugby union) players
New Zealand expatriate rugby union players
New Zealand expatriate sportspeople in England
New Zealand expatriate sportspeople in Japan
New Zealand expatriate sportspeople in Wales
New Zealand sportspeople of Samoan descent
New Zealand rugby union players
Newcastle Falcons players
Nottingham R.F.C. players
Ospreys (rugby union) players
Otago rugby union players
Pacific Islanders rugby union players
People educated at Logan Park High School
People educated at Otago Boys' High School
Rugby union locks
Rugby union players from Huntly, New Zealand
Samoa international rugby union players
Tasman rugby union players
University of Otago alumni